The Rising Stars Challenge is a basketball exhibition game held by the National Basketball Association (NBA) on the Friday before the annual All-Star Game as part of the All-Star Weekend. Being sponsored by Air Jordan, the event is also known as Jordan Rising Stars.

The current format used since 2022 includes rookie and sophomore NBA players and NBA G League Ignite players selected by the NBA's assistant coaches and league office. Former NBA players, designated as "honorary coaches", draft players for their respective teams, where they play in a single-elimination tournament to reach a Final Target Score in each game.

History

Rookie Challenge (1994–2011) 
The Rookie Challenge, established in 1994, was originally competed by two randomly selected teams composed entirely of first-year players. This format was continued until 1996, when it was changed to pit rookie teams of both the Eastern and the Western Conference against each other. In 1999, the game was cancelled as a result of the NBA lockout. Since the 1998 rookie class did not compete that year, the game was revamped and featured a team of standout first-year players ('rookies') against a team of standout second-year players ('sophomores').

Rising Stars Challenge (2012–2021) 
The format of the game and name was changed to the Rising Stars Challenge in 2012.  For 2012 and 2013, the format was changed to having two teams drafted by Basketball Hall of Famers Charles Barkley (Team Chuck) and Shaquille O'Neal (Team Shaq). In 2014, the two teams were drafted by Chris Webber (Team Webber) and Grant Hill (Team Hill). The game format changed in 2015 to Team USA vs Team World, where each team should choose at least three Rookies and three Sophomores, and the squad of each team should have four back courts, four front courts and two swingmen.

Unlike regular NBA games, the game was divided into two twenty-minute halves plus multiple five-minute overtime periods, similar to men's college basketball. The participating players were chosen by voting among the league's assistant coaches. In the game, players wear their respective regular team uniforms, except for 2009, in which players wore fan-designed jerseys. The head coaches of the two teams are the lead assistant coaches of the NBA All-Star Game coach. Starting in 2009, two active NBA players were added to the game coaching staffs.

Tournament-style format (2022–present) 
The format was then changed again in 2022. 28 players are selected: 12 rookies, 12 sophomores, and 4 NBA G League Ignite players. They will be drafted into four teams of seven, which are led and coached by members of the NBA 75th Anniversary Team via a draft, in commemoration of the NBA's 75th anniversary season. The coaches include: Rick Barry, Gary Payton, Isiah Thomas and James Worthy. The format itself is now a tournament, with a Final Target Score for each round: 50 points for the semifinals, and 25 points for the finals, for a total of 75 points total for the team that wins the tournament, again, in commemoration of NBA 75.

The format was slightly altered in 2023. 28 players are still selected, but the poll consists of 21 NBA rookies and sophomores, and 7 NBA G League players (not just limited to NBA G League Ignite). The 21 NBA players will be drafted into three teams led by Pau Gasol, Joakim Noah, and Deron WIlliams, while the 7 NBA G League players form a single team led by Jason Terry. The Final Target Score for the semifinal games is lowered from 50 to 40.

Past games and rosters

2023 roster
Source:

Coaches
Pau Gasol, Joakim Noah, Deron Williams and Jason Terry

Rookies
Paolo Banchero, Orlando Magic F
Jalen Duren, Detroit Pistons C
AJ Griffin, Atlanta Hawks G
Jaden Ivey, Detroit Pistons G
Walker Kessler, Utah Jazz	C
Bennedict Mathurin, Indiana Pacers	G
Keegan Murray, Sacramento Kings F
Andrew Nembhard, Indiana Pacers G
Jabari Smith Jr., Houston Rockets F
Jeremy Sochan, San Antonio Spurs F
Jalen Williams, Oklahoma City Thunder G

Sophomores
Jose Alvarado, New Orleans Pelicans	G
Scottie Barnes, Toronto Raptors F
Josh Giddey, Oklahoma City Thunder	G
Jalen Green, Houston Rockets G
Quentin Grimes, New York Knicks G
Bones Hyland, Los Angeles Clippers G
Evan Mobley, Cleveland Cavaliers F
Trey Murphy III, New Orleans Pelicans F
Alperen Sengun, Houston Rockets	C
Franz Wagner, Orlando Magic F

NBA G League
Sidy Cissoko, G League Ignite G
Scoot Henderson, G League Ignite G
Mojave King, G League Ignite F
Kenneth Lofton Jr., Memphis Hustle	F
Mac McClung, Philadelphia 76ers G
Leonard Miller, G League Ignite F
Scotty Pippen Jr., South Bay Lakers G

 Jalen Duren was unable to participate due to injury.
 Tari Eason was selected as Jalen Duren's replacement.
 Jalen Green was unable to participate due to injury.
 Ayo Dosunmu was selected as Jalen Green's replacement.

2022 roster

 Chris Duarte was unable to participate due to a toe injury.
 Jonathan Kuminga was selected as Chris Duarte's replacement.
 Davion Mitchell was unable to participate due to a hand injury.
 Bones Hyland was selected as Davion Mitchell's replacement.

2021 roster

Due to the downsizing of the All-Star Game due to the COVID-19 pandemic, the NBA All-Star Weekend was not held, and the Rising Stars Challenge was not played. The NBA still named the Rising Stars rosters of first- and second-year players.

2020 game

 Wendell Carter Jr. was unable to participate due to a right ankle injury.
 Zion Williamson was selected as Wendell Carter Jr.'s replacement.
 Tyler Herro was unable to participate due to a sore right ankle.
 Collin Sexton was selected as Tyler Herro's replacement.
 Deandre Ayton was unable to participate due to a sore left ankle.
 Nicolò Melli was selected as Deandre Ayton's replacement.

2019 game

 Lonzo Ball was unable to participate due to a left ankle injury.
 Kevin Knox was selected as Lonzo Ball's replacement.

2018 game

 Malcolm Brogdon was unable to participate due to a leg injury.
 Taurean Prince was selected as Malcolm Brogdon's replacement.
 Lonzo Ball was unable to participate due to a knee injury.
 De'Aaron Fox was selected as Lonzo Ball's replacement.

2017 game

 Embiid was unable to participate due to a knee injury.
 Abrines was named as Embiid's replacement.
 Mudiay was unable to participate due to a back injury.
 Hernangómez was named as Mudiay's replacement.

2016 game

To celebrate the first time the NBA holds the All-Star game outside of the US, the game makes the World Team the home team instead of Team USA.

 Nerlens Noel was unable to participate due to injury.
 Devin Booker was named as Noel's replacement.
 Nikola Mirotić was unable to participate due to injury.
 Trey Lyles was named as Mirotić's replacement.

Team USA won 157–154 in the highest scoring game in Rising Stars Challenge history. Zach LaVine was named MVP, leading all of the USA team with 30 points while also recording 7 rebounds and 4 assists. Jordan Clarkson, D'Angelo Russell, and Devin Booker all scored over 20 points, with Russell also recording 7 assists. Kristaps Porziņģis and Emmanuel Mudiay led the way for Team World with 30 points each, with Andrew Wiggins also scoring 29 points.

2015 game

 Adams was unable to participate due to injury.
 Nurkić was named as Adams' replacement.
 Carter-Williams was unable to participate due to injuries.
 Covington was named as Carter-Williams' replacement.
 Olynyk was unable to participate due to injury.
 Dellavedova was named as Olynyk's replacement.
 Nurkić decided to not participate for personal reasons.
 Papanikolaou was named as Nurkić's replacement.

The World team won against the U.S. 121–112 at the Rising Stars Challenge at All-Star weekend. Canada's Andrew Wiggins scored 22 points, and Rudy Gobert added 18 points, 12 rebounds and three blocks. Brooklyn's Bojan Bogdanovic of Croatia, and Chicago's Nikola Mirotić of Montenegro added 16 points each for the World team. Victor Oladipo of the Orlando Magic and Zach LaVine of the Minnesota Timberwolves led the U.S. team with 22 points each. Andrew Wiggins, the 2014 NBA draft 1st overall pick, won the game's MVP award.

2014 game

 Pero Antić was unable to participate due to injury.
 Miles Plumlee was named Pero Antić's replacement.

2013 game 

 Andre Drummond was unable to participate due to injury.
 Andrew Nicholson was named Andre Drummond's replacement.

2012 game

Shortly before the draft for the rosters, Norris Cole and Jeremy Lin were added to the original player pool. A few days before the game, Tiago Splitter was injured and was replaced by Derrick Favors. Lin played only nine minutes in the game, at his request, due to exhaustion from his rise to stardom that month.

 Tiago Splitter was unable to participate due to injury.
 Kawhi Leonard did not play due to a strained right calf.
 Derrick Favors was named Tiago Splitter's replacement.

2011 game

 Tyreke Evans was unable to participate due to injury.
 James Harden was named Tyreke Evans' replacement.

2010 game

 Derrick Rose was excused from the Rookie Challenge in consideration of being named to the All-Star Game and his participation in the Skills Challenge.
 Anthony Morrow was named as a replacement for Derrick Rose.

2009 game

 Greg Oden was unable to participate due to injury.

2008 game

2007 game

The 2007 Rookie Challenge took place on Friday, February 16 at the Thomas & Mack Center in Las Vegas.

Final Score: Sophomores: 155 Rookies: 114

2006 game

The 2006 Rookie Challenge took place February 17 at the Toyota Center in Houston.

*Did not play due to injury
Final score: Sophomores 105, Rookies 96

2005 game

The 2005 Rookie Challenge took place February 18 at the Pepsi Center in Denver.

*Did not play due to injury

2004 game
The 2004 Rookie Challenge took place February 13 at the Staples Center in Los Angeles.

Said to be the most exciting Rookie Challenge in history due to all the highlight-reel dunks. Much of the hype centered on rookie phenoms LeBron James and Carmelo Anthony, who had 33 and 17 points respectively. Amar'e Stoudemire set a Rookie Challenge record with 36 points (it has since been broken).

2003 game

The 2003 Rookie Challenge took place February 8 at the Philips Arena in Atlanta. This was the last time the game was played on a Saturday.

Final score: Sophomores: 132, Rookies: 112

2002 game

The 2002 Rookie Challenge took place February 9 at the First Union Center in Philadelphia.

2001 game

The 2001 Rookie Challenge took place February 10 at the Verizon Center in Washington, D.C..

2000 game

The 2000 Rookie Challenge took place February 11 at the Oakland Arena in Oakland.

*Did not play due to injury

1998 game

The 1998 Rookie Challenge took place February 8 at the Madison Square Garden in New York.

1997 game

The 1997 Rookie Challenge took place February 8 at the Gund Arena in Cleveland.

**Did not play due to injury

1996 game

The 1996 Rookie Challenge took place February 10 at the Alamodome in San Antonio.

1995 game

The 1995 Rookie Challenge took place February 11 at the America West Arena in Phoenix.

1994 game

The 1994 Rookie Challenge took place February 12 at the Target Center in Minneapolis. Penny Hardaway was the MVP of the game.

Game records

Points
Kevin Durant, 46 (2009)
Kenneth Faried, 40 (2013)
Russell Westbrook, 40 (2010)
Tim Hardaway Jr., 36 (2014)
Amar'e Stoudemire, 36 (2004)
Jamal Murray, 36 (2017)
Kyle Kuzma, 35 (2019)
Jaylen Brown, 35 (2018)
Kyrie Irving, 34 (2012)

Rebounds
Andre Drummond, 25 (2014)
DeJuan Blair, 23 (2010)
Elton Brand, 21 (2000)
DeJuan Blair, 15 (2011)
DeMarcus Cousins, 14 (2011)
Chris Bosh, 14 (2005)
Marcus Fizer, 14 (2002)
Quentin Richardson, 14 (2001)

Assists
John Wall, 22 (2011)
Chris Paul, 17 (2007)
De'Aaron Fox, 16 (2019)
Ben Simmons, 13 (2018)
Jordan Farmar, 12 (2008)
Jamal Murray, 11 (2017)
Chris Paul, 11 (2006)
Jamaal Tinsley, 11 (2003)
Mike Miller, 11 (2002)
Steve Francis, 11 (2000)
Damon Stoudamire, 11 (1996)
Khalid Reeves, 11 (1995)
Trae Young, 10 (2019)
Emmanuel Mudiay, 10 (2016)
Ricky Rubio, 10 (2013)
Isaiah Thomas, 10 (2013)
Kemba Walker, 10 (2012)
O. J. Mayo, 10 (2010)
Ronald Murray, 10 (2004)
Jamaal Tinsley, 10 (2002)

Steals
Chris Paul, 9 (2007)
Eddie Jones, 6 (1995)
De'Aaron Fox, 5 (2019)
Donovan Mitchell, 5 (2018, 2019)
Jason Richardson, 5 (2003)
Kenyon Martin, 5 (2002)

Blocks
Steven Adams, 4 (2014)
Brook Lopez, 3 (2009)
Dwight Howard, 3 (2005)

3 Pointers
Daniel Gibson, 11 (2008)
Jamal Murray, 9 (2017)
Frank Kaminsky, 9 (2017)
Kyrie Irving, 8 (2012)

Shooting Percentage
 David Lee, 100% (14–14) (2007)

MVPs

Participant players by team

References

External links

2015 Rising Stars Challenge at NBA.com
NBA Rising Stars Stats and History at Basketball-reference.com

National Basketball Association All-Star Game
Recurring sporting events established in 1994